Nigtevecht is a village in the province of Utrecht, Netherlands with a population of 1,395. Formerly part of the municipality of Loenen; it has been part of the newly-formed municipality of Stichtse Vecht since 2011.

History 
The village was first mentioned between 1280 and 1287 as te nichtevecht, and means "along the Vecht. Nigtevecht developed along the dike of the river with the church in the centre. In 1673, the village and church were destroyed by the French. Several estates have been built near Nigtevecht by Amsterdam merchants. Nigtevecht was home to 409 people in 1840.

Fort Hinderdam is a little fort on a river island. It used to be part of the Dutch Water Line. In 1913, it became part of the Stelling van Amsterdam. The fort is now in ruins and the island has become a nature area.

Gallery

References

Populated places in Utrecht (province)
Former municipalities of Utrecht (province)
Stichtse Vecht